Kimmo Wilska (born 5 August 1956 in Helsinki) is an English-speaking Finnish newscaster. He worked at YLE from 1985 until 2010 in YLE's morning broadcast, and read the English-language news on YLE News.

On 13 August 2010, Wilska was fired after pretending to be caught drinking beer on camera following an alcohol-related news story. The stunt was too much for YLE, and Wilska was immediately fired. Wilska is known to have previously finished the 2009 Christmas newscast wearing a Santa Claus hat. Wilska received much support from viewers after the incident, and the clip of the gag became an Internet meme amongst Finnish YouTube users.

Wilska has also been politically active as one of the early members of the Green League and as a member of the Finnish Cannabis Association.

References

External links
 YouTube clip of the beer bottle gag
 Kimmo Wilska at YLE's Elävä Arkisto

1956 births
Living people
Mass media people from Helsinki
Journalists from Helsinki
Finnish journalists